Henry Henriksen (25 August 1921 – 17 January 1984) was a Norwegian footballer. He played in one match for the Norway national football team in 1949.

References

External links
 

1921 births
1984 deaths
Norwegian footballers
Norway international footballers
Place of birth missing
Association footballers not categorized by position